Lenin Komsomol Prize was a Soviet annual award for the best works in science, engineering, literature or art carried out by young authors of age not exceeding 33 years. Komsomol was the abbreviated name of The Communist Union of Youth (Russian: Коммунистический союз молодёжи; hence Ком-со-мол, Kom-so-mol).

The award was instituted by the Central Committee of VLKSM in March 1966. The reason for the selection of this particular age threshold is unclear (the age threshold for Komsomol membership is 28). The coincidence of the upper threshold of 33 with the "age of Christ" was a matter of jokes. Symbolically, the first winner of this award in the Soviet Union was writer Nikolay Ostrovsky (who had died aged 32 in 1936).

In addition to the all-Union prize, Union republics had republican versions of the prize, named respectively, e.g., Belarus Lenin Komsomol Prize, and awarded by the republican Komsomol branches.

The prizes were introduced as follows:
 In the field of science and technology - 1967;
 For great achievements in teaching - 1984;
 For great achievements in labour - 1986

The winner was known as "Lenin Komsomol Prize Laureate", and together with the diploma was awarded a medal.

See also

Lenin Prize

Soviet awards
Awards established in 1966
Awards disestablished in 1991
1966 establishments in the Soviet Union
1991 disestablishments in the Soviet Union